is a Japanese freestyle swimmer who competed in the 1932 Summer Olympics. He was born in Kōchi Prefecture. In 1932 he finished fifth in the 100 metre freestyle event.

References

External links
 

1914 births
Year of death missing
Olympic swimmers of Japan
Swimmers at the 1932 Summer Olympics
Japanese male freestyle swimmers
People from Kōchi Prefecture